Below are the results of the fourth season of the Latin American Poker Tour (LAPT).

Results

LAPT São Paulo 
 Cassino: Sheraton World Trade Center São Paulo
 Buy-in: R$5,000 (US$3,000)
 5 Day-event: February 16–20, 2011
 Number of buy-ins: 536
 Total Prize Pool: R$2,391,630 (US$1,449,500)
 Number of payoutss: 64
 Winning Hand: 5♣ 6♣

LAPT Viña del Mar 
 LAPT CHILE NATIONAL POKER CHAMPIONSHIP
 Cassino: Enjoy Viña del Mar Casino & Resort
 Buy-in: US$1,100
 4 Day-event: March 17–20, 2011
 Number of buy-ins: 621
 Total Prize Pool: US$602,400
 Number of Payouts: 48
 Winning Hand:  J♣

LAPT Lima 
 Cassino: Atlantic City Casino
 Buy-in: US$2,700
 5 Day-event: April 13–17, 2011
 Number of buy-ins: 350
 Total Prize Pool: US$848.750
 Number of Payouts: 48
 Winning Hand: K♣

LAPT Punta del Este 
 Cassino: Mantra Resort SPA Casino
 Buy-in: US$2,500
 5 Day-event: August 3–7, 2011
 Number of buy-ins: 422
 Total Prize Pool: US$941.482
 Number of payouts: 56
 Winning Hand:

LAPT Colombia 
 LAPT COLOMBIA NATIONAL POKER CHAMPIONSHIP
 Cassino: Casino Allegre - Centro Comercial Premium Plaza
 Buy-in: Col$ 1,980,000 (approx. US$1,036.00)
 5-day event: October 12–16, 2011
 Number of buy-ins: 681
 Total Prize Pool: COL$1,189,026.000 (approx. US$684,528.50)
 Number of payouts: 63
 Winning Hand: 4♠

LAPT Grand Final São Paulo Carnival Poker Festival 
 Cassino: Sheraton World Trade Center São Paulo
 Buy-in: R$4,000 (US$2,300)
 4 Day-event: February 17–20, 2012
 Number of buy-ins: 367
 Total Prize pool: R$1,317,200 (US$766,000)
 Number of payouts: 48
 Winning Hand:  5♣

References 

Latin American Poker Tour
2011 in poker